Young Stars FC is a football club based in Torit, South Sudan.

The club was established in 2005 by Michael Osukari Aliardo together with other co-founders such as Simon Abaha Ateib known by Okoff.
The team started sounding from 2011 when they were crowned champions of South Sudan Cup in Eastern Equatoria Torit during the time of Juda Ojazy Osuru the general secretary, Adam Ohoi the director, Samson Ohide the treasury and Martin Dowla deputy to Adam. Since 2011, this team remains the champion consecutively till date.

In November 2016, armed gunmen attacked their team bus, killing the driver and injuring six others. Among casualties were chairman Anthon Fermato the chairman of Torit Local Football Association (TLFA), defender James Jordan Ohitu, and club director Abuna Jovince Otimore.

While officiating a fixture in Torit Freedom Square, referee Haidar Moses collapsed on the pitch. He was taken to a nearby hospital where he was pronounced dead; the cause of death remains unknown. However, he was complaining of lethargy before the kick-off.

Achievements

 South Sudan National Cup runners-up 2016
  4x South Sudan Cup winners 2013,2015, 2016, 2019,*2x Torit Premier League Winners 2015, 2018.Governor's Cup winners 2014. And so on  2015

References

External links
 `

Football clubs in South Sudan